Snowblind is a 2010 American Western independent film about a post-apocalyptic world after an ice-age devastated civilization.

The film was released in 2010, and was produced by Mangofilm. It was also released on Blu-ray and in 3D. It is made free for personal distribution on torrent sites under the Creative Commons License, as long as money is not charged.

The movie is also known as Snowblind 3D.

Plot
In this post-apocalyptic spaghetti western, a governor pardons a gunslinger sentenced to death, in order to have him kill another gunslinger. He doesn't tell about the girl; complications ensue.

Cast
 Robert Lyons as Clayton Young
 Mala Ghedia as Naina Saberneck
 Erik Hansen as Matthew Saberneck
 Jana Pallaske as Barbara Midnite
 Dharmander Singh as Governor Bhavesh Lafort
 Albee Lesotho as Marshal Phillip Clarke
 Wim Wenders as Gray Fox
 Angus McGruther as Virgil Dakota
 Christian Serritiello as Deputy Frank Holden
 Ricky Watson as Duke Thompson
 Mathias Jürgens as Johnny Levi
 Stephen Patrick Hanna as Sheriff Jack Palance
 Indira Weis as Kassie Kalifornia
 Elisa Duca as Maria Cotrelli
 Nadine Petry as Chili Bean

References

External links

2010 films
American independent films
American Western (genre) films
2010 Western (genre) films
2010s English-language films
2010s American films